Magnell is a Swedish surname. Notable people with the surname include:

 Agnes Magnell (1878–1966), Swedish architect
 Ola Magnell (1946–2020), Swedish pop-rock singer and guitarist

Swedish-language surnames